Ingrandes may refer to the following communes in France:

 Ingrandes, Indre, in the Indre department
 Ingrandes, Maine-et-Loire, in the Maine-et-Loire department
 Ingrandes, Vienne, in the Vienne department
 Ingrandes-de-Touraine, in the Indre-et-Loire department